Demesvar Delorme (10 February 1831 – 25 December 1901) was a Haitian theoretician, writer, and politician. Born in Cap-Haïtien, he participated in Sylvain Salnave's failed rebellion against President Fabre Geffrard in 1865. After the fall of Geffrard and Salnave's election as President of Haiti in 1867, he was appointed Minister of External Relations and Minister of Public Education and Cults. 

In 1868, he was forced to leave the country and fled to Paris, France, where he lived in exile for ten years, publishing several works. One of his best known writings was the essay "Les Théoriciens au Pouvoir", which postulated that political power should belong to the intellectual elite.

From 1891–1897, he was the first resident minister in Berlin with coacredition to the Holy See. In Rome he represented with Jean Joseph Dalbémar the government of Haiti in a case of border arbitrage under the auspicies of Pope Leo XIII, while the government of Santo Domingo was represented by Justino Faszowicz Baron de Farensbach and

Selected works 
 "Bulletin de la Révolution" - article, published 1865
 "La Reconnaissance du Général Salnave" - article, published 1868
 "La Démocratie et le Préjugé de Couleur aux Etats-Unis" - article
 "Le Système Monroe" - article, published 1868
 "Les Théoriciens au Pouvoir" - essay, published 1870
 Francesca - novel, published 1873
 "Réflexions Diverses sur Haïti" - essay, published 1873
 "Les Paisibles" - article, published 1874
 Le Damné - novel, published 1877

References
 

1831 births
1901 deaths
Haitian essayists
Male essayists
Haitian journalists
19th-century Haitian novelists
Haitian male novelists
People from Cap-Haïtien
Foreign Ministers of Haiti
Government ministers of Haiti
19th-century essayists
19th-century male writers
Ambassadors of Haiti to the Holy See
Ambassadors of Haiti to Germany